NEMO Equipment, Inc. is a company based in Dover, New Hampshire, that designs and manufactures outdoor equipment, tents, sleeping pads and shelters. NEMO was founded by Cam Brensinger in 2002, while studying industrial design at the Rhode Island School of Design.

History
In 2004, at the Summer Market Outdoor Retailer show in Salt Lake City, NEMO introduced its first line of backpacking and mountaineering tents. A few months later, the company won the 2005 ISPO BrandNew Award from Munich, Germany. Later in 2005, NEMO's products were named among the best inventions of the year by Time magazine, Reader's Digest, Men's Journal, and Popular Science. NEMO has also been recognized numerous times for its design with the Good Design Award from the Chicago Athenaeum, a Design Distinction honor from I.D. magazine, and the 2006 Bottom Line Design Award from Business 2.0 and Frog Design. NEMO tents have also received numerous accolades from outdoor publications such as Backpacker's 2008 Best All-Around Mountaineering tent and Rock & Ice Editor Choice Award.

Design distinction
NEMO is best known for its AirSupported Technology, which incorporates low pressure airbeams in place of traditional aluminum tent poles.

NEMO has also worked with the NASA Institute for Advanced Concepts on its Extreme eXPeditionary Architecture (EXP-Arch) project to create shelter concepts based on highly mobile, quickly deployable, and retractable architecture systems.

See also 

 Haglöfs
 Sierra Bullets
 Vacuactivus

References

External links

American companies established in 2002
Camping equipment manufacturers
Companies based in New Hampshire
Climbing and mountaineering equipment companies
Sporting goods manufacturers of the United States